Lucien Lauk (29 June 1911 – 8 June 2001) was a French racing cyclist. He rode in the 1948 Tour de France.

References

External links

1911 births
2001 deaths
French male cyclists
Cyclists from Paris